KPUS (104.5 FM, "Classic Rock 104.5") is a radio station broadcasting a classic rock music format. Licensed to Gregory, Texas, United States, the station serves the Corpus Christi area. The station is currently owned by John Bushman, through licensee ICA Radio, Ltd., and features programming from United Stations Radio Networks. Its studios are located along South Padre Island Drive in Corpus Christi, and the transmitter is in Ingleside, Texas.

History
The station was assigned the call letters KBHD on July 17, 1998. On September 18, 1998, the station changed its call sign to KKPN, on March 26, 2001 to the current KPUS,

On March 26, 2020, ICA Radio relaunched Classic Rock 104.5 as 104.5 The Eagle, Corpus Christi's ONLY Classic Rock Station.

References

External links

Classic rock radio stations in the United States
PUS
Radio stations established in 1999
1999 establishments in Texas